Seydou Boro (born 20 February 1968 in Ouagadougou) is a Burkinabé actor, dancer, and choreographer. He played the lead in the 1995 Dani Kouyate-directed film Keïta! l'Héritage du griot.

Discography
Hôrôn' (Label Bleu, 2016)

References

External links

Official website

1968 births
Living people
20th-century Burkinabé male actors
Burkinabé choreographers
People from Ouagadougou
Burkinabé male film actors
Label Bleu artists
21st-century Burkinabé people